Troublesome Night 16 is a 2002 Hong Kong horror comedy film produced by Nam Yin and directed by Yip Wai-ying. It is the 16th of the 20 films in the Troublesome Night film series.

Plot
Bud Gay and Bud Yan travel back in time to the Song dynasty and encounter characters from the 14th century Chinese classical novel Water Margin. The movie spoofs the story of Wu Song avenging his brother, with the Buds playing important roles in affecting how the story unfolds.

Cast
 Simon Lui as Ximen Qing
 Yammie Lam as Pan Jinlian
 Law Lan as Mrs Bud Lung / Granny Wang
 Kenny Bee as Song Jiang
 Lawrence Lau as Wu Dalang
 Tong Ka-fai as Bud Gay
 Ronnie Cheung as Bud Yan
 Onitsuka as Lai Chor-pat / Yan Qing
 Mr Nine as Lai Chor-kau / Lu Zhishen
 Chan Sze-wai as Sandy
 Ken Chung as Wu Song

External links
 
 

2002 comedy horror films
2002 films
Hong Kong comedy horror films
2000s Cantonese-language films
Troublesome Night (film series)
2000s Hong Kong films